Manduca violaalba is a moth of the family Sphingidae first described by Benjamin Preston Clark in 1922.

Distribution 
It is known from  Brazil.

Description 
The length of the forewings is about 39 mm. It is a unique species in the genus Manduca because of its much darker forewings, also contrasted by its whitish hindwings.

References

Manduca
Moths described in 1922